General elections were held in Guam on November 2, 2010. Voters in Guam chose their Governor, their non-voting delegate to the United States House of Representatives, Attorney General, as well as all fifteen members of the territorial legislature. The election coincided with the 2010 United States elections.

Governor of Guam 

Two term incumbent Republican Governor Felix Perez Camacho was term limited and could seek re-election. Former Democratic Governor Carl Gutierrez and his running mate, Frank Aguon, is seeking election against the Republican gubernatorial ticket of Senator Eddie Calvo and his running mate, Ray Tenorio.

United States House of Representatives 

Incumbent Delegate Madeleine Bordallo (D) was running unopposed for re-election for Guam's lone At-large congressional seat. She was re-elected unopposed.

Attorney General 
Three candidates are seeking election as Attorney General, Gary Gumataotao, Leonardo Rapadas, and William C. Bischoff.

Primary election results

General election results

Legislature of Guam 

All fifteen seats in the Legislature of Guam are up for election. Democrats, under Speaker Judith T.P. Won Pat, controlled ten seats in the Legislature before the 2010 election, while Republicans held five seats.

Vice Mayor of Agat

Candidates

Democratic 
Former Guam Youth Congress Derick Baza Hills, is a resident of Agat and previously served as Speaker from 2008 to 2010.

Republican 
Vice Mayor Agustin Quintanilla is running for re-election.
Joseph Nededog Salas is a current resident of Agat and running for Vice Mayor.

Primary Election Results

General Election Results

Consolidated Commission on Utilities

Candidates
Three candidates are seeking election as CCU, will have three seats.

Eloy Perez Hara, current CCU Vice-chair
Benigno Manibusan Palomo, current CCU Vice-chair
Simon A. Sanchez II, current CCU Chairman and son of the late former University of Guam President Dr. Pedro C. Sanchez, and the grandson of the late School superintendent Simon A. Sanchez.

Results

Judicial retention elections 
The Chief Justice of the Supreme Court, F. Philip Carbullido, and one Superior Court Judge, Anita A. Sukola, were up for retention.

References

General elections in Guam
2010 Guam elections